The Special Interest Group "Model-Driven Software Engineering" (SIG-MDSE) organizes the MDSE as an academic conference.

This special interest group focus on model driven (or model based) and architecture centred software engineering techniques and tools, e.g. OMG's MDA (Model Driven Architecture). It is a platform for all interested persons to exchange experiences in the context of workshops, conferences etc. The activities are mainly in Germany. Once or twice a year an academic workshop is organized.

Current events
MDSE 2008 was held in Berlin, Germany in 2008   .

Proceedings
The refereed Proceedings of MDSE 2008 was published in the Logos Proceedings series.

History

MDSE (2007)

Dates: 15 June 2007
Location: (Stuttgart, Germany)
Organizers: Florian Fieber (qme Software), Wolfgang Neuhaus (Itemis), Roland Petrasch (TFH Berlin)
Proceedings:  
Web site:

MDSE (2006)

Dates: 1 December 2006
Location: (Hamburg, Germany)
Organizers: Florian Fieber (qme Software), Wolfgang Neuhaus (Itemis), Roland Petrasch (TFH Berlin) 
Proceedings:  
Web site:   Software architecture